Rhabdotis sobrina is a species of Scarabaeidae, the dung beetle family.

Subspecies 
Rhabdotis sobrina aethiopica (Allard, 1992)
Rhabdotis sobrina virginea

References 

Cetoniinae
Beetles described in 1833